Nika Pani (نکہ پانی) is a village and union council of Mansehra District in Khyber-Pakhtunkhwa province of Pakistan. It is located in the east of the district.

References

Union councils of Mansehra District
Populated places in Mansehra District